Luke Goedeke (born November 21, 1998) is an American football guard for the Tampa Bay Buccaneers of the National Football League (NFL). He played college football at UW–Stevens Point before transferring to Central Michigan.

Early life and high school
Goedeke, who is of German descent, grew up in Whitelaw, Wisconsin and attended Valders High School in Valders, Wisconsin. He played tight end in high school and almost gave up the sport due to a severe shoulder injury.

College career
Goedeke began his collegiate career at Wisconsin–Stevens Point. As a freshman, he caught 12 passes for 132 yards. After the season, Goedeke transferred to Central Michigan University. He redshirted his first season at CMU and moved from tight end to the offensive line. He was named the Chippewas' starting right tackle as a redshirt sophomore and started all 14 of the team's games. Goedeke missed the 2020 season due to a knee injury. He was named first-team All-Mid-American Conference as a redshirt junior.

Professional career

Goedeke was selected in the second round with the 57th overall pick of the 2022 NFL Draft by the Tampa Bay Buccaneers.

References

External links 
 Tampa Bay Buccaneers bio
UW–Stevens Point Pointers bio
Central Michigan Chippewas bio

1998 births
Living people
American football offensive tackles
American football offensive guards
American people of German descent
Central Michigan Chippewas football players
People from Manitowoc County, Wisconsin
Players of American football from Wisconsin
Wisconsin–Stevens Point Pointers football players
Tampa Bay Buccaneers players